Beatson is a surname. Notable people with the surname include:

Alexander Beatson (1759–1833), East India Company office, governor of St. Helena, and experimental agriculturist
Benjamin Wrigglesworth Beatson, (1803–1874), English classical scholar
George Beatson (1848–1933), British physician
George Steward Beatson (d. 1874), Scottish doctor
Patrick Beatson (1758–1800), Scottish-born mariner and shipbuilder
Robert Beatson (1742–1818), Scottish writer

See also

 Beatson West of Scotland Cancer Centre
 Bateson (surname)

Patronymic surnames